William Henry Reno (born January 26, 1936) is a retired United States Army lieutenant general who served as Deputy Chief of Staff G-1 Personnel of The United States Army from 1990 to 1992. Born in Smithville, Oklahoma, he enlisted in the Army on August 23, 1954. Reno was subsequently appointed to the United States Military Academy and graduated in 1961 with a B.S. degree in military science. He later attended Princeton University, earning both an M.A. degree and an M.S. degree in civil engineering in 1967.

References

1936 births
Living people
People from McCurtain County, Oklahoma
United States Army soldiers
United States Military Academy alumni
Princeton University alumni
Princeton University School of Engineering and Applied Science alumni
United States Army personnel of the Vietnam War
Recipients of the Meritorious Service Medal (United States)
Recipients of the Legion of Merit
United States Army generals
Recipients of the Distinguished Service Medal (US Army)